Gerard Milton Earnhart (April 1, 1918 – June 6, 2020) was an American politician and former broadcast journalist. He was a Democratic member of the Arkansas House of Representatives from 1959 to 1966 and the Arkansas Senate from 1967 to 1980.

Career 
Earnhart served in the United States Army during World War II. Prior to entering politics, Earnhart was a broadcaster and a weatherman for KFSM-TV, a CBS News affiliate in Fort Smith, Arkansas. He worked in his family's vehicle repair business, originally established as Armbruster & Co in 1921.

Personal life 
Earnhart was married to Mary Elizabeth Robben and had three children. He turned 100 in April 2018. Earnhart died on June 6, 2020, at the age of 102.

References

1918 births
2020 deaths
20th-century American politicians
American centenarians
Democratic Party Arkansas state senators
Democratic Party members of the Arkansas House of Representatives
Men centenarians
Military personnel from Missouri
Politicians from Fort Smith, Arkansas
People from St. Louis County, Missouri
United States Army personnel of World War II